The Girls of La Rochelle (French: Les filles de La Rochelle) is a 1962 French historical comedy film directed by Bernard Deflandre and starring Philippe Lemaire, Raymond Bussières and Geneviève Cluny. It takes its name from a traditional folk song.

Cast
 Philippe Lemaire as Capitaine Timoléon  
 Raymond Bussières as Pépin  
 Geneviève Cluny as Hildegarde 
 Annette Poivre as Isabeau de Bavière  
 Noël Roquevert as Charles VI
 Philippe de Broca 
 Guy Decomble as Sire Basile  
 Max Desrau as L'Écossais  
 André Gabriello 
 Gustave  as Engolvent  
 Jocelyne Langer as Teutberge  
 Paul Mercey as Le maire de La Rochelle  
 Pierre Parel as Geoffroy

References

Bibliography 
 John Haines. Music in Films on the Middle Ages. Routledge, 2013.

External links 
 

1962 films
1960s French-language films
1960s historical comedy films
French historical comedy films
Films set in the 15th century
1960s French films